Nanglo is a flat round woven tray  made up of bamboo. It is made traditionally out of thin bamboo pieces intermingled into a flat surface-like ancient method of weaving cloth manually by tangling threads. It is used for sifting grain and used to separate dust particles from paddy, rice, dal, beans, and other cereals (winnowing). Nanglo is an indispensable part of every Nepali kitchen. While it is mostly limited to villages, it can be found occasionally on large cities as well.

References 

Nepalese culture
Gurkhas